Adam Pickering (born 18 April 1981) is a Novated Lease Specialist and former Australian rules footballer who played for the Carlton Football Club in the Australian Football League (AFL). After being delisted by Carlton, Pickering moved to Western Australian to play for East Perth in the West Australian Football League (WAFL).  He was appointed coach of Swan Districts before the 2018 WAFL season.

Sources

Holmesby, Russell & Main, Jim (2009). The Encyclopedia of AFL Footballers. 8th ed. Melbourne: Bas Publishing.

External links

Adam Pickering's profile at Blueseum

Carlton Football Club players
Living people
1981 births
Australian rules footballers from Victoria (Australia)
Calder Cannons players
East Perth Football Club players
Swan Districts Football Club coaches